The following is a list of international prime ministerial trips made by Sheikh Hasina since becoming Prime Minister of Bangladesh in 2009, as well as visits made during her first term between 1996 and 2001.

1996

2000

2009

2010

2011

2012

2013

2014

2015

2016

2017

2018

2019

2020

2022

Notes

References

Trips
Lists of diplomatic trips
Diplomacy-related lists
21st century in international relations
Bangladesh prime ministerial visits